Lapachu, also known as Apolista or Aguachile, is an extinct Arawakan language of Bolivia. Aikhenvald (1999) classifies it together with Terena, Moxos, and related languages. It is not clear from surviving descriptions whether it was one language or two.

References

Arawakan languages

pms:Lenga enawené-nawé
Languages of Bolivia